The Dynamic Sound Patterns (subtitled of the Rod Levitt Orchestra) is the debut album led by American jazz trombonist Rod Levitt which was recorded in 1963 for the Riverside label.

Reception

The Allmusic site awarded the album 3 stars stating "even though Dynamic Sound Patterns isn't an orchestral project in the true sense, Levitt still gives the band a very big, full sound. There are eight musicians onboard -- five horns and a rhythm section -- but Levitt gives the illusion that he is leading a larger outfit... much of the material has a Thelonious Monk-influenced angularity. Dynamic Sound Patterns didn't make Levitt a huge name in the jazz world; nonetheless, this album is an enjoyable demonstration of his skills as both soloist and an arranger/bandleader".

Track listing
All compositions by Rod Levitt
 "Holler" - 9:08  
 "Ah! Spain" - 4:31  
 "Jelly Man" - 4:57  
 "Upper Bay" - 8:52  
 "El General" - 4:29  
 "His Master's Voice" - 8:04

Personnel 
Rod Levitt - trombone, arranger, conductor  
Rolf Ericson - trumpet
Buzz Renn - soprano saxophone, clarinet
George Marge - tenor saxophone, clarinet, piccolo
Gene Allen - baritone saxophone, clarinet
Sy Johnson - piano
John Beal - bass
Ronnie Bedford - drums

References 

1963 albums
Rod Levitt albums
Riverside Records albums